Thomas McGrath (1898–1976) was an Australian rugby league footballer who played in the 1910s and 1920s.

Playing career
McGrath had a long career at the Glebe Dirty Reds. Known by the nickname of 'Chaff', he played eight seasons in first grade for Glebe: 1917 and 1921–1927. He played in lock-forward in the 1922 Final Glebe team that were defeated 35–3 by North Sydney at the Sydney Cricket Ground.

Death
A resident of Glebe, New South Wales his entire life, McGrath died on 11 January 1976, aged 77.

References

Glebe rugby league players
Australian rugby league players
Rugby league second-rows
Rugby league props
1898 births
1976 deaths